is a Japanese former freestyle wrestler. Starting in 1998 she won almost every major competition, including three Olympic Games, four Asian Games, and 13 world championships, and became the most decorated athlete in freestyle wrestling history. As of 2016, Yoshida had only three senior career losses in international competitions, to Marcie Van Dusen (0–2) on 20 January 2008 at the Team World Cup series, Valeria Zholobova (1–2) on 27 May 2012 at the World Cup, and to 
Helen Maroulis (1–4) on 18 August 2016 at the Olympic Games in Rio de Janeiro.

Yoshida was the flagbearer for Japan at the 2006 Asian Games and at the 2012 Olympics. In 2007, she became the first female wrestler to be named Japanese Athlete of the Year, and in 2012 she received the People's Honour Award.

Weight
Yoshida started competing internationally as a cadet, in 1998, in the 52 kg category.  By 2002, when she moved to seniors, she competed in the 59 kg division. The same year, she lost 4 kg, and remained in the 55 kg category until 2014. She moved to the 53 kg class at the 2014 World Cup and World Championships as part of her preparation for the 2016 Olympics, where the traditional 48–55–63–75 kg scheme will be changed to 48–53–58–63–69–75 kg. However, two weeks after the World Championships she returned to the 55 kg category at the 2014 Asian Games, which kept the old weight divisions. Yoshida announced her retirement on Twitter in January 2019.

Family and public life
Yoshida is the daughter of Eikatsu Yoshida, a former national champion and wrestling coach. She started training in wrestling aged 3, following her father and two elder brothers. Since 2011 she is a face of the ALSOK security group and regularly appears in their commercials.

In December 2008, the wrestling singlet which Yoshida wore in the Olympic final bout earlier that year, was sold for 551,000 yen (ca. US$6,123) at an internet auction, and the money was donated to the Japanese Red Cross society.

In 2013, when the International Olympic Committee named wrestling as a candidate for exclusion from the Games, she became an active part of the Japanese lobbying team that persuaded the IOC to retain wrestling at the 2020 Tokyo Olympics.

In May 2014 Yoshida made a cameo appearance in the Japanese television drama Tokyo Metropolitan Guard Center, and later wished to resume acting after retiring from wrestling.

Olympic Games/World Championship/Asian Games matches 
{| class="wikitable"
|-
! Res.
! Record
! Opponent
! Score
! Date
! Event
! Location
|-
! style=background:white colspan=8 | 
|-
| Loss
| 89-1
| align=left |  Helen Maroulis
| style="font-size:88%"|1-4
| style="font-size:88%" rowspan=4|August 18, 2016
| style="font-size:88%" rowspan=4|2016 Summer Olympics
| style="text-align:left;font-size:88%;" rowspan=4|  Rio de Janeiro
|-
| Win
| 89-0
| align=left |  Betzabeth Argüello
| style="font-size:88%"|6-0
|-
| Win
| 88-0
| align=left |  Isabelle Sambou
| style="font-size:88%"|4-0
|-
| Win
| 87-0
| align=left |  Nataliya Synyshyn
| style="font-size:88%"|9-0
|-
! style=background:white colspan=8 | 
|-
| Win
| 86-0
| align=left |  Sofia Mattsson
| style="font-size:88%"|2-1
| style="font-size:88%" rowspan=5|September 10, 2015
| style="font-size:88%" rowspan=5|2015 World Championship
| style="text-align:left;font-size:88%;" rowspan=5|  Las Vegas, NV
|-
| Win
| 85-0
| align=left |  Jong Myong-suk
| style="font-size:88%"|5-2
|-
| Win
| 84-0
| align=left |  Anzhela Dorogan
| style="font-size:88%"|11-0
|-
| Win
| 83-0
| align=left |  Nguyễn Thị Lụa
| style="font-size:88%"|10-0
|-
| Win
| 82-0
| align=left |  Nadine Tokar
| style="font-size:88%"|Fall
|-
! style=background:white colspan=8 | 
|-
| Win
| 81-0
| align=left |  Sündeviin Byambatseren
| style="font-size:88%"|12-1
| style="font-size:88%" rowspan=4|September 28, 2014
| style="font-size:88%" rowspan=4|2014 Asian Games
| style="text-align:left;font-size:88%;" rowspan=4|  Inchon
|-
| Win
| 80-0
| align=left |  Babita Kumari
| style="font-size:88%"|14-4
|-
| Win
| 79-0
| align=left |  Phạm Thị Loan
| style="font-size:88%"|Fall
|-
| Win
| 78-0
| align=left |  Zhong Xuechun
| style="font-size:88%"|12-9
|-
! style=background:white colspan=8 | 
|-
| Win
| 77-0
| align=left |  Sofia Mattsson 
| style="font-size:88%"|6-0
| style="font-size:88%" rowspan=4|September 10, 2014
| style="font-size:88%" rowspan=4|2014 World Championship
| style="text-align:left;font-size:88%;" rowspan=4|  Tashkent
|-
| Win
| 76-0
| align=left |  Jillian Gallays
| style="font-size:88%"|Fall
|-
| Win
| 75-0
| align=left |  Natalia Malysheva
| style="font-size:88%"|10-0
|-
| Win
| 74-0
| align=left |  Pang Qianyu
| style="font-size:88%"|Fall
|-
! style=background:white colspan=8 | 
|-
| Win
| 73-0
| align=left |  Sofia Mattsson
| style="font-size:88%"|5-0
| style="font-size:88%" rowspan=5|September 19, 2013
| style="font-size:88%" rowspan=5|2013 World Championship
| style="text-align:left;font-size:88%;" rowspan=5|  Budapest
|-
| Win
| 72-0
| align=left |  Iryna Husyak
| style="font-size:88%"|8-0
|-
| Win
| 71-0
| align=left |  Sündeviin Byambatseren
| style="font-size:88%"|8-0
|-
| Win
| 70-0
| align=left |  Valeria Koblova
| style="font-size:88%"|7-0
|-
| Win
| 69-0
| align=left |  Ana Maria Pavăl
| style="font-size:88%"|8-0
|-
! style=background:white colspan=8 | 
|-
| Win
| 68-0
| align=left |  Helen Maroulis
| style="font-size:88%"|Fall
| style="font-size:88%" rowspan=4|September 28, 2012
| style="font-size:88%" rowspan=4|2012 World Championship
| style="text-align:left;font-size:88%;" rowspan=4|  Strathcona County, AL
|-
| Win
| 67-0
| align=left |  Nataliya Synyshyn
| style="font-size:88%"|Fall
|-
| Win
| 66-0
| align=left |  Geeta Phogat
| style="font-size:88%"|Fall
|-
| Win
| 65-0
| align=left |  Akziya Dautbayeva
| style="font-size:88%"|Fall
|-
! style=background:white colspan=8 | 
|-
| Win
| 64-0
| align=left |  Tonya Verbeek
| style="font-size:88%"|3-0, 2-0
| style="font-size:88%" rowspan=4|9 August, 2012
| style="font-size:88%" rowspan=4|2012 Summer Olympics
| style="text-align:left;font-size:88%;" rowspan=4|  London
|-
| Win
| 63-0
| align=left |  Valeria Zholobova
| style="font-size:88%"|1-0, 2-0
|-
| Win
| 62-0
| align=left |  Yuliya Ratkevich
| style="font-size:88%"|1-0, 2-0
|-
| Win
| 61-0
| align=left |  Kelsey Campbell
| style="font-size:88%"|1-0, 1-0
|-
! style=background:white colspan=8 | 
|-
| Win
| 60-0
| align=left |  Tonya Verbeek
| style="font-size:88%"|0-1, 2-2, 3-2
| style="font-size:88%" rowspan=5|September 15, 2011
| style="font-size:88%" rowspan=5|2011 World Championship
| style="text-align:left;font-size:88%;" rowspan=5|  Istanbul
|-
| Win
| 59-0
| align=left |  Ida-Theres Nerell
| style="font-size:88%"|6-0, 6-0
|-
| Win
| 58-0
| align=left |  Alma Valencia
| style="font-size:88%"|5-0, 7-0
|-
| Win
| 57-0
| align=left |  Helen Maroulis
| style="font-size:88%"|Fall
|-
| Win
| 56-0
| align=left |  Emriye Musta
| style="font-size:88%"|Fall
|-
! style=background:white colspan=8 | 
|-
| Win
| 55-0
| align=left |  Zhang Lan
| style="font-size:88%"|5-0, 1-0
| style="font-size:88%" rowspan=4|November 26, 2010
| style="font-size:88%" rowspan=4|2010 Asian Games
| style="text-align:left;font-size:88%;" rowspan=4|  Guangzhou
|-
| Win
| 54-0
| align=left |  Pak Yon-hui
| style="font-size:88%"|Fall
|-
| Win
| 53-0
| align=left |  Liliya Shakirova
| style="font-size:88%"|1-0, 7-0
|-
| Win
| 52-0
| align=left |  Batbaataryn Nomin-Erdene
| style="font-size:88%"|4-0, 5-0
|-
! style=background:white colspan=8 | 
|-
| Win
| 51-0
| align=left |  Yuliya Ratkevich
| style="font-size:88%"|2-0, 6-0
| style="font-size:88%" rowspan=5| September 9, 2010
| style="font-size:88%" rowspan=5|2010 World Championship
| style="text-align:left;font-size:88%;" rowspan=5|  Moscow
|-
| Win
| 50-0
| align=left |  Maria Gurova
| style="font-size:88%"|5-0, 3-0
|-
| Win
| 49-0
| align=left |  Tatiana Suarez
| style="font-size:88%"|3-0, 7-0
|-
| Win
| 48-0
| align=left |  Tamara Kazaryan
| style="font-size:88%"|6-0, 6-0
|-
| Win
| 47-0
| align=left |  Um Ji-eun
| style="font-size:88%"|Fall
|-
! style=background:white colspan=8 | 
|-
| Win
| 46-0
| align=left |  Sona Ahmadli
| style="font-size:88%"|3-0, 6-0
| style="font-size:88%" rowspan=5| September 24, 2009
| style="font-size:88%" rowspan=5|2009 World Championship
| style="text-align:left;font-size:88%;" rowspan=5|  Herning
|-
| Win
| 45-0
| align=left |  Tonya Verbeek
| style="font-size:88%"|3-0, 3-2
|-
| Win
| 44-0
| align=left |  Ana Maria Pavăl
| style="font-size:88%"|Fall
|-
| Win
| 43-0
| align=left |  Anna Gomis
| style="font-size:88%"|1-0, 2-1
|-
| Win
| 42-0
| align=left |  Maminirina Rafaliharisolo
| style="font-size:88%"|8-0, 7-0
|-
! style=background:white colspan=8 | 
|-
| Win
| 41-0
| align=left |  Xu Li
| style="font-size:88%"|Fall
| style="font-size:88%" rowspan=4|August 16, 2008
| style="font-size:88%" rowspan=4|2008 Summer Olympics
| style="text-align:left;font-size:88%;" rowspan=4|  Beijing
|-
| Win
| 40-0
| align=left |  Tonya Verbeek
| style="font-size:88%"|2-0, 6-0
|-
| Win
| 39-0
| align=left |  Natalia Golts
| style="font-size:88%"|2-1, 4-0
|-
| Win
| 38-0
| align=left |  Ida-Theres Nerell
| style="font-size:88%"|3-1, 4-0
|-
! style=background:white colspan=8 | 
|-
| Win
| 37-0
| align=left |  Ida-Theres Nerell
| style="font-size:88%"|8-0
| style="font-size:88%" rowspan=5| September 21, 2007
| style="font-size:88%" rowspan=5|2007 World Championship
| style="text-align:left;font-size:88%;" rowspan=5|  Baku
|-
| Win
| 36-0
| align=left |  Alena Filipava
| style="font-size:88%"|7-0
|-
| Win
| 35-0
| align=left |  Jackeline Rentería Castillo
| style="font-size:88%"|7-4
|-
| Win
| 34-0
| align=left |  Joice Silva
| style="font-size:88%"|10-0
|-
| Win
| 33-0
| align=left |  Jessica Bechtel
| style="font-size:88%"|9-0
|-
! style=background:white colspan=8 | 
|-
| Win
| 32-0
| align=left |  Olga Smirnova
| style="font-size:88%"|3-0, 6-0
| style="font-size:88%" rowspan=3|December 11, 2006
| style="font-size:88%" rowspan=3|2006 Asian Games
| style="text-align:left;font-size:88%;" rowspan=3|  Doha
|-
| Win
| 31-0
| align=left |  Su Lihui
| style="font-size:88%"|6-1, 2-0
|-
| Win
| 30-0
| align=left |  Alka Tomar
| style="font-size:88%"|1-0, 5-0
|-
! style=background:white colspan=8 | 
|-
| Win
| 29-0
| align=left |  Mariya Ivanova
| style="font-size:88%"|13-0
| style="font-size:88%" rowspan=5| September 29, 2006
| style="font-size:88%" rowspan=5|2006 World Championship
| style="text-align:left;font-size:88%;" rowspan=5|  Guangzhou
|-
| Win
| 28-0
| align=left |  Ida-Theres Nerell
| style="font-size:88%"|10-3
|-
| Win
| 27-0
| align=left |  Anna Gomis
| style="font-size:88%"|3-1
|-
| Win
| 26-0
| align=left |  Natalya Golts
| style="font-size:88%"|8-0
|-
| Win
| 25-0
| align=left |  Marcia Mendoza
| style="font-size:88%"|6-3
|-
! style=background:white colspan=8 | 
|-
| Win
| 24-0
| align=left |  Lihui Su
| style="font-size:88%"|6-0
| style="font-size:88%" rowspan=5| September 28, 2005
| style="font-size:88%" rowspan=5|2006 World Championship
| style="text-align:left;font-size:88%;" rowspan=5|  Budapest
|-
| Win
| 23-0
| align=left |  Tonya Verbeek
| style="font-size:88%"|4-0
|-
| Win
| 22-0
| align=left |  Ludmila Cristea
| style="font-size:88%"|6-0
|-
| Win
| 21-0
| align=left |  Ana Maria Paval
| style="font-size:88%"|4-0
|-
| Win
| 20-0
| align=left |  Rathi Neha
| style="font-size:88%"|10-0
|-
! style=background:white colspan=8 | 
|-
| Win
| 19-0
| align=left |  Tonya Verbeek
| style="font-size:88%"|5-0
| style="font-size:88%" rowspan=2|August 23, 2004
| style="font-size:88%" rowspan=4|2004 Summer Olympics
| style="text-align:left;font-size:88%;" rowspan=4|  Athens
|-
| Win
| 18-0
| align=left |  Anna Gomis
| style="font-size:88%"|7-6
|-
| Win
| 17-0
| align=left |  Diletta Giampiccolo
| style="font-size:88%"|10-0
| style="font-size:88%" rowspan=2|August 22, 2004
|-
| Win
| 16-0
| align=left |  Sun Dongmei
| style="font-size:88%"|11-0
|-
! style=background:white colspan=8 | 
|-
| Win
| 15-0
| align=left |  Tina George
| style="font-size:88%"|5-2
| style="font-size:88%" rowspan=6| September 12, 2003
| style="font-size:88%" rowspan=6|2003 World Championship
| style="text-align:left;font-size:88%;" rowspan=6|  New York City, NY
|-
| Win
| 14-0
| align=left |  Natalya Golts
| style="font-size:88%"|3-2
|-
| Win
| 13-0
| align=left |  Jennifer Ryz
| style="font-size:88%"|10-0
|-
| Win
| 12-0
| align=left |  Monika Michalik
| style="font-size:88%"|4-0
|-
| Win
| 11-0
| align=left |  Kitti Godo
| style="font-size:88%"|3-0
|-
| Win
| 10-0
| align=left |  Olga Serbina
| style="font-size:88%"|10-0
|-
! style=background:white colspan=8 | 
|-
| Win
| 9-0
| align=left |  Tina George
| style="font-size:88%"|10-4
| style="font-size:88%" rowspan=5| November 11, 2002
| style="font-size:88%" rowspan=5|2002 World Championship
| style="text-align:left;font-size:88%;" rowspan=5|  Chalkida
|-
| Win
| 8-0
| align=left |  Ida-Theres Nerell
| style="font-size:88%"|10-0
|-
| Win
| 7-0
| align=left |  Jennifer Ryz
| style="font-size:88%"|11-0
|-
| Win
| 6-0
| align=left |  Minerva Perez
| style="font-size:88%"|10-1
|-
| Win
| 5-0
| align=left |  Tatyana Lazareva
| style="font-size:88%"|3-0
|-
! style=background:white colspan=8 | 
|-
| Win
| 4-0
| align=left |  Lee Na-lae
| style="font-size:88%"|11-1
| style="font-size:88%" rowspan=4|October 6, 2002
| style="font-size:88%" rowspan=4|2002 Asian Games
| style="text-align:left;font-size:88%;" rowspan=4|  Busan
|-
| Win
| 3-0
| align=left |  Alka Tomar
| style="font-size:88%"|10-0
|-
| Win
| 2-0
| align=left |  Naidangiin Otgonjargal
| style="font-size:88%"|7-0
|-
| Win
| 1-0
| align=left |  Sun Dongmei
| style="font-size:88%"|10-0

Championships and accomplishments
Tokyo Sports
Wrestling Special Award (2002, 2003, 2004, 2006, 2009, 2011, 2012, 2013, 2014, 2015)

See also
List of multiple Olympic gold medalists
List of multiple Olympic gold medalists in one event
List of multiple Olympic medalists in one event
List of multiple Summer Olympic medalists

References

External links

 Athlete Biography at beijing2008

Japanese female sport wrestlers
1982 births
Living people
People from Tsu, Mie
Olympic wrestlers of Japan
Wrestlers at the 2004 Summer Olympics
Wrestlers at the 2008 Summer Olympics
Wrestlers at the 2012 Summer Olympics
Wrestlers at the 2016 Summer Olympics
Olympic gold medalists for Japan
Olympic silver medalists for Japan
Olympic medalists in wrestling
Medalists at the 2016 Summer Olympics
Medalists at the 2012 Summer Olympics
Medalists at the 2008 Summer Olympics
Medalists at the 2004 Summer Olympics
Asian Games medalists in wrestling
Wrestlers at the 2002 Asian Games
Wrestlers at the 2006 Asian Games
Wrestlers at the 2010 Asian Games
Wrestlers at the 2014 Asian Games
World Wrestling Championships medalists
Asian Games gold medalists for Japan
Recipients of the Medal with Purple Ribbon
People's Honour Award winners
Medalists at the 2002 Asian Games
Medalists at the 2006 Asian Games
Medalists at the 2010 Asian Games
Medalists at the 2014 Asian Games
Universiade medalists in wrestling
Universiade gold medalists for Japan
Medalists at the 2005 Summer Universiade
Shigakkan University alumni
21st-century Japanese women